Robert Gooch (1784–1830) was an English physician.

Robert Gooch may also refer to:

Robert Kent Gooch (1893–1982), American football player
Sir Robert Gooch, 11th Baronet (1903–1978), British Army officer and politician
Sir Robert Douglas Gooch, 4th Baronet (1905–1989), of the Gooch baronets

See also
Gooch (disambiguation)